Viborg FF are a Danish football club which are based in Viborg, Denmark. During the 2014/15 campaign they competed in the Danish 1st Division and DBU Pokalen. They are currently under the management of Aurelijus Skarbalius.

Competitions

Danish 1st Division

DBU Pokalen

League table

Current squad
As of 20 May 2014.

External links
 Viborg FF - official site
 Viborg FF Fans - official supporter club site
 Fanatikos - Viborg Ultras
 VFF Nyheder - Viborg FF news

Viborg FF seasons
Viborg FF